Padatik may refer to:
 Padatik (film), a 1973 film directed by Mrinal Sen
 Padatik (poetry collection), a 1970 collection by Subhas Mukhopadhyay 
 Padatik Nattya Sangsad, a theatre group based in Bangladesh
 Padatik (Indian theatre group), a Kolkata-based theatre group established in 1972
 Padatik Express, a daily Superfast train which runs between Sealdah and New Alipurduar via New Jalpaiguri (Siliguri) in West Bengal.